Clinton College was a private college in New Middleton, Smith County, Tennessee. It was established in 1830 as Porter's Hill Academy.

History
Clinton College was founded as a college for young men by Francis Haynes Gordon in 1830 as Porter's Hill Academy and assumed the final name in 1833. By February 1842 Clinton College had failed.

Notable alumni
Edmund Pettus
Simon Pollard Hughes, Jr.

References

 
1830 establishments in Tennessee
1842 disestablishments in Tennessee
Buildings and structures in Smith County, Tennessee
Defunct private universities and colleges in Tennessee
Education in Smith County, Tennessee
Educational institutions established in 1830
Educational institutions disestablished in 1842